Thomas Fermor-Hesketh may refer to:
 Thomas Fermor-Hesketh, 1st Baron Hesketh, British peer, soldier and politician
 Thomas George Fermor-Hesketh, British baronet and soldier
 Sir Thomas Fermor-Hesketh, 5th Baronet, English politician